The Margate Jetty (also known as Margate Pier) was a pier in Margate, Kent, in England initially constructed of wood in 1824.  It was rebuilt in iron in 1855 and extended and added to over the years.  It closed in 1976 over safety concerns and was severely damaged in a storm two years later.  Demolition took many years and some parts remained until 1998.

Wooden jetty  
The first jetty on the site was a  wooden structure built by the Margate Pier Harbour Company in 1824.  It was known as the Jarvis Landing Stage and allowed ships to load and unload passengers at low tide when Margate Harbour was inaccessible.

Iron jetty 
The wooden structure required frequent repair and, on 4 November 1851, was broken in two places during a storm.  A new iron jetty, designed by Eugenius Birch, was begun in 1853.  It became the first iron seaside pier in the world when it opened in 1855, though work to complete it continued until 1857.  A pavilion was constructed at the pierhead in 1858 and used as a station building for steamship departures and arrivals.  The pier was extended between 1875 and 1878, at which time the distinctive octagonal pierhead was added.  On 1 January 1877 the pier was cut through by a shipwreck driven by a storm; between 40 and 50 people were trapped on the seaward side of the break until the next day when they could be rescued.  On 24 November 1877 the jetty was struck again by a drifting vessel that caused £4,000 of damage to the structure.  Additions were made to the pier in 1893 and 1900.  In 1898 a building and slipway was constructed on the pier to allow the Royal National Lifeboat Institution (RNLI) Margate Lifeboat Station to be relocated to the pier.

The Margate lifeboat was one of the Little Ships of Dunkirk that sailed to France in May-June 1940 to assist with Operation Dynamo, the evacuation of members of the British and French armies ahead of the German advance.  Part of the pier's decking was pulled up in 1940 to prevent its use by a potential invading German army.  The decking was later replaced and the pier used to load Allied troop and supply vessels.  After the war the pier returned to use as a steamship jetty, with the last sailings being made in 1966.  The pavilion was badly damaged by fire in 1964.  Margate Jetty closed because of safety concerns in 1976.

Destruction and aftermath 

A storm surge on 11–12 January 1978 destroyed much of the structure and washed debris onto the beach.  The RNLI station was isolated by the collapse.  A RAF Search and Rescue Force Westland Wessex helicopter airlifted a lifeboat crew to the station to launch the boat and recover it to Ramsgate Lifeboat Station.  A replacement RNLI station was later constructed at Margate Harbour, where it remains in use.  The wooden wreckage of the pier was burnt on the beach in the days following the storm surge, though portions were salvaged by local residents.  Significant sections of the pier remained standing and demolition was attempted over the following years.  More than 12 controlled explosions were made to demolish parts of the structure and the final portions were dismantled in 1998.

Some relics from the pier structure are held at Margate Museum, these include the entrance plaque and portions of the railings and deck.  The museum also holds a collection of memorabilia relating to the pier.  Other pieces of salvaged wreckage can be found at locations across the town.  A fundraising campaign was begun in 2007 to raise money to rebuild the pier.  In summer 2018 a Dreamland Margate Mural-by-the-Sea art installation was erected at the former landward end of the pier.  This took the form of a horseshoe-shaped lifebuoy with the words "Save Yourselves" written on it.

Turner painting 

The artist J. M. W. Turner boarded for a time in Margate and painted an oil sketch that included the jetty, which he could see from his window. It is thought that this work became damaged and was rolled up. Davies donated the work to National Museum Wales in 1952. An assessment in 1956 determined that it was not a work by Turner but just in his style. A reassessment in 2012 determined that the brushwork and colours used was typical of late Turner paintings and it was attributed to him.

Gallery

References 

Piers in Kent
Margate
1824 establishments in England
1976 disestablishments in England